Novosofiyevka is a rural locality (a village) in Bala-Chetyrmansky Selsoviet, Fyodorovsky District, Bashkortostan, Russia. The population was 198 as of 2010. There is 1 street.

Geography 
Novosofiyevka is located 34 km southeast of Fyodorovka (the district's administrative centre) by road. Sergeyevka is the nearest rural locality.

References 

Rural localities in Fyodorovsky District